Marikina's 2nd congressional district is one of the two congressional districts of the Philippines in the city of Marikina. It has been represented in the House of Representatives of the Philippines since 2007. The district was created in 2006 following the passage of Republic Act No. 9364 which amended the 1996 Marikina City Charter (Republic Act No. 8223). It consists of the northern Marikina barangays of Concepcion Uno, Concepcion Dos, Fortune, Marikina Heights, Parang, Nangka and Tumana. It is currently represented in the 19th Congress by Stella Quimbo of the Liberal Party (LP).

Representation history

Election results

2022

2019

2016

2013

2010

See also
Legislative districts of Marikina

References

Congressional districts of the Philippines
Politics of Marikina
2006 establishments in the Philippines
Congressional districts of Metro Manila
Constituencies established in 2006